The Municipality of Sevnica is a municipality along the Sava and the Mirna Rivers in southeastern Slovenia. The seat of the municipality is the town of Sevnica. Today it is part of the Lower Sava Statistical Region. It is the 12th-largest municipality by area in Slovenia.

Settlements
In addition to the municipal seat of Sevnica, the municipality also includes the following settlements:

 Apnenik pri Boštanju
 Arto
 Birna Vas
 Blanca
 Boštanj
 Breg
 Brezje
 Brezovo
 Budna Vas
 Čanje
 Čelovnik
 Cerovec
 Češnjice
 Dedna Gora
 Dolenji Boštanj
 Dolnje Brezovo
 Dolnje Impolje
 Dolnje Orle
 Drožanje
 Drušče
 Gabrijele
 Gabrje
 Gornje Brezovo
 Gornje Impolje
 Gornje Orle
 Goveji Dol
 Hinjce
 Hinje
 Hudo Brezje
 Jablanica
 Jelovec
 Jeperjek
 Kal pri Krmelju
 Kamenica
 Kamenško
 Kaplja Vas
 Kladje nad Blanco
 Kladje pri Krmelju
 Koludrje
 Kompolje
 Konjsko
 Krajna Brda
 Križ
 Križišče
 Krmelj
 Krsinji Vrh
 Laze pri Boštanju
 Ledina
 Leskovec v Podborštu
 Log
 Loka pri Zidanem Mostu
 Lončarjev Dol
 Lukovec
 Mala Hubajnica
 Malkovec
 Marendol
 Metni Vrh
 Mrtovec
 Mrzla Planina
 Novi Grad
 Okroglice
 Orehovo
 Orešje nad Sevnico
 Osredek pri Hubajnici
 Osredek pri Krmelju
 Otavnik
 Pavla Vas
 Pečje
 Pijavice
 Podboršt
 Podgorica
 Podgorje ob Sevnični
 Podvrh
 Poklek nad Blanco
 Polje pri Tržišču
 Ponikve pri Studencu
 Preska
 Prešna Loka
 Primož
 Račica
 Radež
 Radna
 Razbor
 Rogačice
 Rovišče pri Studencu
 Selce nad Blanco
 Šentjanž
 Šentjur na Polju
 Škovec
 Skrovnik
 Slančji Vrh
 Slap
 Šmarčna
 Spodnje Mladetiče
 Spodnje Vodale
 Srednik
 Štajngrob
 Stržišče
 Studenec
 Svinjsko
 Telče
 Telčice
 Trnovec
 Trščina
 Tržišče
 Velika Hubajnica
 Veliki Cirnik
 Vranje
 Vrh pri Boštanju
 Vrhek
 Zabukovje nad Sevnico
 Zavratec
 Zgornje Mladetiče
 Zgornje Vodale
 Žigrski Vrh
 Žirovnica
 Znojile pri Studencu
 Žurkov Dol

Notable people
Notable people from the Municipality of Sevnica include the model Melanija Knavs (married Melania Trump), the handball player Matjaž Mlakar, the historian Janko Prunk (from Loka pri Zidanem Mostu), and the writer Ludvik Mrzel (also from Loka pri Zidanem Mostu).

References

External links

Sevnica.si. Official page of the municipality.
Municipality of Sevnica at Geopedia 

 
Sevnica
Sevnica
1994 establishments in Slovenia